The 2018 Campeonato Brasileiro de Marcas season will be the eight season of the Brasileiro de Marcas.

Teams and drivers
{|
|

Race calendar and results
All races were held in Brazil.

Championship standings
Points system
Points are awarded for each race at an event to the driver/s of a car that completed at least 75% of the race distance and was running at the completion of the race.

Race: Used for the first and second race, with partially reversed (top eight) of each event.
Final round: Used for the final round of the season with double points.

Drivers' Championship

References

External links
  

Marcas
Brasileiro de Marcas seasons